Dr. Sindy Joyce  is an Irish Traveller human rights activist and academic sociologist. In January 2019 she became the first Irish Traveller to obtain a doctorate from an Irish university. Her doctoral thesis funded by the Irish Research Council, "Mincéirs Siúladh: An ethnographic study of young Travellers’ experiences of urban space", explored the interaction of young Travellers with the settled community and the Gardaí in Galway city.

Publications
 Sindy Joyce, "Divided Spaces: An examination of everyday racism and its impact on young Travellers' spatial mobility", Irish Journal of Anthropology, 18/1 (2015)
 Sindy Joyce, Margaret Kennedy and Amanda Haynes, "Anti-Traveller and Anti-Roma Hate Crime in Ireland", in Critical Perspectives on Hate Crime: An Irish Perspective, edited by A. Haynes, J. Schweppe, and S. Taylor, London: Palgrave Macmillan, 2017.

Awards
In 2014 Joyce received a Traveller Pride Award for Education. On 4 April 2019 Michael D. Higgins, the President of Ireland, appointed her to his Council of State.

References

External links
 Interview with Sindy Joyce on The Late Late Show, posted on the Late Late Show YouTube channel, 23 September 2016.
 Sindy Joyce, Ireland - Testimony at the 2017 Dublin Platform on the Front Line Defenders YouTube channel, 28 October 2017.

Year of birth missing (living people)
Living people
Alumni of the University of Limerick
Irish sociologists
Irish human rights activists
Irish Travellers
People from County Limerick
Presidential appointees to the Council of State (Ireland)